Hunter Hills is a neighborhood located west of downtown Atlanta, Georgia, United States.  Its motto, "One Community, One Family", has been its cornerstone since 2001.  The neighborhood is encompassed in the 30314 zip code.  Hunter Hills shares borders with Mozley Park, Dixie Hills and West Lake neighborhoods.  The neighborhood rests just inside Atlanta's perimeter highway I-285, and U.S. Route 78 (Bankhead Highway).  The schools that serve the neighborhood are Stanton Elementary, Carter G. Woodson Elementary School, Ron Clark Academy, Herndon Elementary and Washington High School, and the Atlanta Job Corps.  City of Refuge, a community-based 501(c)(3) non-profit, was established on the 1300 block of Joseph E. Boone Blvd. in 2003 and helps to bring transformation to individuals and families through services including housing, health and wellness, vocational training, and youth development.

History
During the 1940s and 1950s Hunter Hills came to life as one of the few planned black communities of its time.  Hunter Hills was partially responsible for the economic rise in Atlanta after World War II.  Its history is shared with other neighboring communities such as Mozley Park, Washington Park, and Dixie Hills, which all were part of the Battle of Ezra Church.  Several black contractors such as Herman Glass, developed and purchased land in what is now known as Hunter Hills.  Most of the lots were 50 x 150 ft (15 x 46 m2) and they could obtain a loan from First Atlanta National, Citizens or Southern Banks.  If a person was able to afford $5 down and $5 per month he was making Hunter Hills' history and could become a part of a new black community in Atlanta.  Hunter Hills is bounded south to MLK and the Seaboard Coast rail-line, east to the Beltline (former Louiseviile and Nashville RR. and Mayson Turner Rd., Joseph Boone St. North and west to Holly Road.  Its West Side Siege Line is located on the corner of Joseph Boone (Simpson Road) and Chappell Road.

Hunter Hills is part of two Neighborhood Planning Units (NPU's), J and K, which are separated by Holly Rd.  Even house number belong to NPU J and odd house numbers belong to K.

Hunter Hills is adjacent to the esteemed Atlanta University Center Consortium (commonly referred to as the AUC Consortium).  The consortium includes: Clark Atlanta University, Morehouse College, Spelman College, and Morehouse School of Medicine.

Proposed development
Hunter Hills falls on the western edge of the proposed Beltline and is minutes from the City of Atlanta's planned Westside Park.  Hunter Hills is also served by local transit MARTA.  It shares the West Lake Marta Station with West Lake and Dixie Hills communities, and MARTA bus line 51 runs north to south from Joseph Boone to Martin Luther King streets.

Hunter Hills is north of the proposed Martin Luther King Corridor Redevelopment, which will dramatically increase home ownership and bring in local businesses.  Hunter Hills is also one of many westside neighborhoods affected by the nation's foreclosure crisis.  However, real estate investors expect the proposed development plans to spur the neighborhood's revitalization.

Notable residents
Hunter Hills has also been the past home of several black community icons: Ann Nixon Cooper, Tuskegee Airman John Loyd Atkinson Sr., C. T. Alexander, Charles Harper and founder of the Atlanta Daily World newspaper C. A. Scott.

References

Neighborhoods in Atlanta